Tanner Bruhn (born 27 May 2002) is an Australian rules footballer who plays for the Geelong Football Club in the Australian Football League (AFL).

Early football
Bruhn began his footballing career with the Newtown & Chilwell Football Club in the western suburbs of Geelong. Bruhn played 55 matches with the club between 2013 and 2018. He played in the Firsts team at his school, Geelong Grammar School, where he won the best and fairest award in 2018 as a 16 year old. He played for Vic Country in the Under 16 Championships and won its MVP award and All-Australian title. His 2019 season saw him impacted by injury after hurting his knee, however he was fit enough to play a few matches with the Geelong Falcons in the NAB League, and Vic Country in the 2019 AFL Under 18 Championships.

AFL career
There was immediate controversy surrounding Bruhn's new career at the Giants after he was shown to have a 'solemn' reaction to being drafted by them on draft night. However, it was later explained by him that it was due to him having a rather 'reserved' personality, and being shocked. On debut, Bruhn collected 9 disposals, 2 tackles and 2 clearances. After only collecting 7 disposals the next week against , Bruhn was omitted from the team. Bruhn received a nomination for the Goal of the Year award after kicking a skilful goal in the eighth round of the season.

After the 2022 AFL season, Bruhn requested a trade to the newly-crowned premiers, . Bruhn was traded for Geelong's first round draft pick on 7 October.

Statistics
Updated to the end of the 2022 season.

|- 
| 2021 ||  || 5
| 13 || 4 || 4 || 56 || 45 || 101 || 16 || 33 || 0.3 || 0.3 || 4.3 || 3.4 || 6.6 || 0.8 || 1.8 || 0
|-
| 2022 ||  || 5
| 17 || 7 || 3 || 93 ||109 ||202  || 38 || 59 || 0.4 ||0.2 ||5.5||6.4 || 11.9 || 2.2 || 3.5 || 1
|- class=sortbottom
! colspan=3 | Career
! 30 !! 11 !! 7 !! 149 !! 154 !! 303 !! 54 !! 92 !! 0.4 !! 0.2 !! 5.0 !! 5.1 !! 10.1 !! 1.8 !! 3.1 !! 1
|}

References

2002 births
Living people
Greater Western Sydney Giants players
Australian rules footballers from Victoria (Australia)
Geelong Falcons players